The Wells County Fairgrounds in Fessenden, North Dakota was listed on the National Register of Historic Places in 1991.

It includes a horse barn and many other individual features.

Wells County Museum
The Wells County Museum, operated by the Wells County Historical Society, occupies one of the buildings at the fairgrounds.

Displays include pioneer tools and household artifacts, farm equipment, jewelry, clothing, Native American artifacts, tools, dollhouses, weapons, dresses, Norwegian artifacts, newspapers and antique vehicles. The Pony Gulch County School is also available to tour.

The museum is open during the fair and at other times by appointment.

References

External links
 Wells County Fair

Park buildings and structures on the National Register of Historic Places in North Dakota
Tourist attractions in Wells County, North Dakota
Historic districts on the National Register of Historic Places in North Dakota
National Register of Historic Places in Wells County, North Dakota
Fairgrounds in the United States